El Hamma du Jérid is a town and commune in the Tozeur Governorate, Tunisia. As of 2004, it had a population of 6,259 inhabitants.

See also
List of cities in Tunisia

References

Populated places in Tozeur Governorate
Communes of Tunisia
Tunisia geography articles needing translation from French Wikipedia